"Am I Losing You" is a 1957 single written and first recorded by American country music artist Jim Reeves. It spent two weeks at number three on the country singles chart. A 1960 re-recording peaked at number eight on the same chart, and number 31 on the Billboard Hot 100; this version was the B-side to the single "I Missed Me", which also peaked at number three on the country chart.

In 1981, Ronnie Milsap covered "Am I Losing You" for his album Out Where the Bright Lights Are Glowing. Milsap's version spent one week at number one on the country chart.

Charts

Jim Reeves

Ronnie Milsap

References

1957 songs
1957 singles
1960 singles
1981 singles
Jim Reeves songs
Ronnie Milsap songs
Songs written by Jim Reeves
Song recordings produced by Tom Collins (record producer)
RCA Records singles